Champapet is a residential neighbourhood of Hyderabad, India. It is known for its many function halls. This was a small village until the 1990s, but has grown due to its proximity to the city. It is administered as Ward No. 17 of Greater Hyderabad Municipal Corporation.

Transport 
Champapet is connected by buses run by TSRTC. The following bus routes 104A, 102C ,104S

References 

Neighbourhoods in Hyderabad, India
Municipal wards of Hyderabad, India